Shangrao railway station is a railway station located in Xinzhou District, Shangrao, Jiangxi Province, People's Republic of China.

It serves the railway junction of Hangzhou–Changsha section of Shanghai–Kunming High-Speed Railway (Hukun HSR) and Hefei–Fuzhou High-Speed Railway (Hefu HSR).

This station has platforms on both the north-south Hefei–Fuzhou high-speed railway and the west-east Hangzhou–Changsha high-speed railway. There is a loop north of the station allowing trains arriving from the south to continue east or west, and vice versa.

Pictures
 

Railway stations in Jiangxi
Shangrao